John Byrne (born 29 August 1962 in Dublin) was an Irish soccer player during the 1980s and 1990s.

Byrne played for Home Farm, Bohemians, Sligo Rovers and St Patricks Athletic during his career in the League of Ireland. He moved to Bohs from the 'Farm in 1982 and was top league scorer for Bohs during the 1986/87 season. His goalscoring record for that season showed a total of 9 goals in 22 league games. He moved to Sligo from Bohs when his contract ran out at the end of the 1989/90 season and spent 3 seasons there scoring 9 goals in 107 total appearances, 6 goals in 87 league appearances. He moved to St Pats from Sligo Rovers in 1993, signing for Brian Kerr under whom he won a league winners medal in 1995/96.

His son Seán has followed in his footsteps and currently plays for Athlone Town. John currently works as a full-time sports lecturer in Technological University Dublin, a position he has held since 2002. He is a holder of the UEFA B License and currently coaches for Hartstown Huntstown based in Mulhuddart.

Honours
Leinster Senior Cup : (1)
 Bohemians - 1985

References

Republic of Ireland association footballers
League of Ireland players
Bohemian F.C. players
Home Farm F.C. players
Sligo Rovers F.C. players
St Patrick's Athletic F.C. players
1962 births
Living people
Association football midfielders